John Reid McKay (born 1 November 1898) was a Scottish footballer who played as an inside forward.

Career
Born in Glasgow, McKay played club football for Celtic, Blackburn Rovers, Middlesbrough and Hibernian, and made one appearance for Scotland in 1924.

References

1898 births
Year of death missing
Scottish footballers
Scotland international footballers
Celtic F.C. players
Blackburn Rovers F.C. players
Middlesbrough F.C. players
Hibernian F.C. players
Association football inside forwards
Place of death missing